The 2017 Slovak Cup Final (known as the Slovnaft Cup for sponsorship reasons) was the final match of the 2016–17 Slovak Cup, the 48th season of the top cup competition in Slovak football. The match was played at the NTC Poprad in Poprad on 1 May 2017 between MFK Skalica and ŠK Slovan Bratislava.

Road to the final
Note: In all results below, the score of the finalist is given first (H: home; A: away).

Match

Details

References

Slovak Cup Finals
Cup Final
Slovak Cup
May 2017 sports events in Europe